Antelope Valley Mall is an enclosed shopping mall in Palmdale, California, in the Antelope Valley.

The main indoor mall currently has about 140 stores with 5 anchor stores, 2 of which are closed - Macy's (formerly Gottschalks), JCPenney, the first Dillard's in Southern California, Sears (closed), and Forever 21 (closed, formerly Mervyns). The mall also has a large Dick's Sporting Goods, which opened in 2014 in a suite originally occupied by Harris and another Gottschalks store. Three other anchors, Bullock's, The Broadway, and J. W. Robinson's were planned, but never opened. 

In 2007, the mall went through an extensive renovation that moved the old 10-screen theater to a replacement Cinemark 16-screen "stadium style seating" theater in the north ring road area.

Mervyns closed in December 2008 and became Forever 21 in 2009. Forever 21 closed in 2018.

On June 22, 2020, it was announced that Sears would be closing as part of a plan to close 28 stores nationwide. Sears closed on September 6, 2020.

In 2022 the mall was acquired by Bridge Group Investments for $60 million.

References

Sources and external links
Antelope Valley Mall official website

Buildings and structures in Palmdale, California
Shopping malls in Los Angeles County, California
Shopping malls established in 1990